al-Fazari is a surname. The attributive title (nisba), Fazari, denotes an origin from Fazara ibn Dhubyan. Notable people with the surname include:

 Samura ibn Junbad al-Fazari, one of the 7th century Companions of the Prophet
 Abd Allah ibn Mas'ada al-Fazari
 Ibrāhīm al-Fazārī, 8th century Muslim astronomer
 Muḥammad ibn Ibrāhīm al-Fazārī, 8th century Muslim astronomer and translator; son of Ibrahim
 Adi ibn Artah al-Fazari (died 720) was a governor of al-Basrah for the Umayyad dynasty, serving during the caliphate of 'Umar ibn 'Abd al-'Aziz.
 Umar ibn Hubayra al-Fazari (floruit 710–724) was a prominent Umayyad general and governor of Iraq, who played an important role in the Qays–Yaman conflict of this period.
 Al-Mughirah ibn Ubaydallah al-Fazari, 8th century Umayyad governor of Egypt.
 Yazid ibn Umar al-Fazari (died 750) was the last Umayyad governor of Iraq.
 Abu Ishaq al-Fazari

Nisbas